Kurgat is a surname of Kenyan origin that may refer to:

Eliud Kurgat (born 1973), Kenyan long-distance runner and winner of the Tilburg Ten Miles
Lydia Kurgat (born 1976), Kenyan marathon runner
Nickson Kurgat (born 1988), Kenyan marathon runner and winner of the Chuncheon Marathon
Nicholas Kurgat (born 1979), Ugandan long-distance runner and winner of the 2009 Humarathon
Titus Kurgat (born 1982), Kenyan marathon runner and 2012 winner of the Riga Marathon
Ronald Kimeli Kurgat (born 1985), Kenyan marathon runner and course record holder of the Jerusalem Marathon
Sammy Kurgat (born 1975), Kenyan marathon runner and 2008 winner of the Cologne Marathon
Stanley Kurgat, Kenyan politician and member of parliament for Keiyo South Constituency

Kenyan names